Hartmut Kirchhübel (born 23 April 1952) is a former professional tennis player from Germany.

Biography
Born in East Germany, Kirchhübel and his family moved to Hanover when he was seven. After school he studied at a Medical College in Hanover, then worked as a Medizinalassistenten before completing his PhD at Hannover Medical School.

Kirchhübel didn't begin competing in professional tennis until the age of 28. In 1980 he partnered with Robert Reininger to win the Sofia Open, a tournament on the Grand Prix tennis circuit. It was in doubles that he made his only Grand Slam appearance, which was at the 1981 Wimbledon Championships with Klaus Eberhard.

In 1983 he returned to medicine and since 1992 has worked in Wolfratshausen as an orthopedist.

Grand Prix career finals

Doubles: 1 (1–0)

References

External links
 
 

1952 births
Living people
West German male tennis players
People from Waldheim, Saxony
German orthopedic surgeons